Andre Lewis may refer to:
 Mandré (1948–2012), American musician
 Andre Lewis (footballer) (born 1994), Jamaican footballer
 Andre Lewis, artistic director of the Royal Winnipeg Ballet

See also
Andrew Lewis (disambiguation)